Mighty Barrolle is a football club from Liberia based in Monrovia.  They are one of the founding members of football in Liberia. Their home Stadium is the Doris Williams Stadium. Liberia's most famous footballer, George Weah, began his career at Mighty Barolle, scoring 7 goals in 10 games in the 1985/86 season. Mighty Barrolle, commonly called "the Rollers",  were promoted back to the First Division in 2016 after a successful campaign in Division 2.

Achievements
Liberian Premier League: 13
 1967, 1972, 1973, 1974, 1986, 1988, 1989, 1993, 1995, 2000–01, 2004, 2006, 2009

Liberian Cup: 8
 1974, 1978, 1981, 1983, 1984, 1985, 1986, 1995

Performance in CAF competitions
CAF Champions League: 2 appearances

2007 – Preliminary Round
2011 – Preliminary Round

CAF Confederation Cup: 1 appearance
2009 – Preliminary Round

 African Cup of Champions Clubs: 8 appearances
1968: disqualified in First Round
1973: First Round
1974: First Round
1987: Second Round
1989: First Round
1990: First Round
1994: withdrew in First Round
1996: withdrew in Third Round Note: Due to Civil War

CAF Cup: 1 appearance
1997 – disqualified in First Round

CAF Cup Winners' Cup: 6 appearances
1975 – First Round
1982 – First Round
1984 – First Round
1985 – First Round
1986 – Second Round
1988 – First Round

Current squad

Football clubs in Liberia
Association football clubs established in 1964
Sport in Monrovia
1964 establishments in Liberia